Maksymilian Jackowski (11 October 1815 in Slupia, Grand Duchy of Posen – 14 January 1905 in Posen) was a Polish activist, secretary-general of the Central Economic Society (Centralne Towarzystwo Gospodarcze), patron of the agricultural circles.

References
 Witold Jakóbczyk, Przetrwać na Wartą 1815–1914, Dzieje narodu i państwa polskiego, vol. III-55, Krajowa Agencja Wydawnicza, Warszawa 1989

1815 births
1905 deaths
People from Poznań County
Polish politicians
People from the Grand Duchy of Posen
[[Category:Poles - political prisoners in the Prussian partition))